was one of twelve s built for the Imperial Japanese Navy (IJN) during the 1920s. During the Pacific War, she participated in the Battle of Wake Island in December 1941 and the occupations of New Guinea and the Solomon Islands in early 1942.

History
Construction of the Mutsuki-class destroyers was authorized as part of the Imperial Japanese Navy's build up following the abandonment of the Washington Naval Treaty from fiscal 1923. The class was a follow-on to the earlier  and  destroyers, with which they shared many common design characteristics. Uzuki, built at the Ishikawajima Shipyards in Tokyo, was laid down on 11 January 1924, launched on 15 October 1925 and commissioned on 14 September 1926. Originally commissioned simply as Destroyer No. 25, the ship was assigned the name Uzuki on 1 August 1928.

In the late 1930s, Uzuki participated in combat actions in the Second Sino-Japanese War, covering the landings of Japanese troops in central and southern China, and the Invasion of French Indochina.

World War II history
At the time of the attack on Pearl Harbor, Uzuki was part of Desron 23 under Carrier Division 2 in the IJN 1st Air Fleet, and deployed from Hahajima in the Ogasawara Islands as part of the Japanese invasion force for the Invasion of Guam. She returned to Truk in early January 1942 to covering the landings of Japanese forces during "Operation R" at Kavieng, New Ireland on 23 January, returning to Truk one month later. In March, Uzuki assisted in covering landings of Japanese forces during "Operation SR" in the northern Solomon Islands, Lae and Admiralty Islands. The destroyer was reassigned to the IJN 4th Fleet on 10 April. During the Battle of the Coral Sea from 7–8 May 1942, Uzuki was assigned to escort the tanker Hoyo Maru in the Shortlands area, and returned to Sasebo Naval Arsenal for refitting on 28 May. By the end of June, Uzuki was based at Truk, and assigned to escort convoys carrying airfield construction crews from Truk to Bougainville and Guadalcanal, and patrols around Rabaul. During the invasion of Buka (21–22 July), Uzuki was strafed by Allied aircraft, with loss of 16 crewmen. On 11 August, Uzuki sortied from Rabaul to rescue the survivors of the cruiser . At the end of August, while on a "Tokyo Express" transport run to Guadalcanal, Uzuki suffered damage from a near miss in an attack by USAAF B-17 Flying Fortress bombers, and returned via Rabaul, Truk and Saipan back to Sasebo for repairs on 14 September.

Uzuki was assigned to the IJN 8th Fleet on 1 December 1942, and escorted the aircraft carrier  from Yokosuka to Truk, and a troop convoy from Truk to Rabaul at the end of the year. However, at Rabaul on 25 December, Uzuki suffered heavy damage in a collision with the torpedoed transport Nankai Maru, and was taken in tow by the destroyers  and  back to Rabaul for emergency repairs. While at Rabaul, the ship was further damaged in an air raid on 5 January 1943. The destroyer  towed Uzuki to Truk for further repairs, and then Uzuki returned to Sasebo under her own power by 3 July. On 23–24 October, Uzuki sortied to Jacquinot Bay on New Britain to rescue the survivors of her sister ship . Uzuki continued to make "Tokyo Express" transport runs throughout the Soloman Islands to the end of November. On 24–25 November, Uzuki engaged US Navy destroyers at the Battle of Cape St. George, during the Japanese evacuation of Buka, but without damage. In December, Uzuki was assigned to escort tankers from Rabaul to Truk and Palau and back.

In January 1944, Uzuki escorted the cruiser  back to Japan. After refit at Sasebo Naval Arsenal, Uzuki escorted troop convoys from Yokosuka to Palau, Yap, Saipan and Truk through the end of June. During the Battle of the Philippine Sea (19–20 June), Uzuki was part of the Second Supply Force. On 20 June, she rescued the crew of the transport Genyo Maru, and sank the crippled transport with gunfire. Uzuki continued to escort convoys from Kure to Manila and Singapore to the middle of November. On 18 July, she was assigned to the Combined Fleet, and on 20 November, was reassigned to the IJN 5th Fleet.

Uzuki was struck from the navy list on 10 January 1945.

Notes

References

External links
Mutsuki-class destroyers on Materials of the Imperial Japanese Navy

Mutsuki-class destroyers
Ships built by IHI Corporation
1925 ships
Second Sino-Japanese War naval ships of Japan
World War II destroyers of Japan
Shipwrecks in the Visayan Sea
World War II shipwrecks in the Pacific Ocean
Maritime incidents in December 1944
Naval magazine explosions